Enteromius eburneensis is a species of ray-finned fish in the genus Enteromius which is found in the rivers flowing from Mount Nimba in West Africa.

Footnotes 

 

Enteromius
Taxa named by Max Poll
Fish described in 1941